Branco ("white" in Portuguese and Galician) may refer to:

Places
Branco River (disambiguation), various rivers in Brazil
Cape Branco, on the coast of Paraíba, Brazil
Branco, Cape Verde, an island
Morro Branco, Cape Verde, a mountain on the island of São Vicente

People
Branco, a white Brazilian
Branco (surname)
Branco (footballer), Brazilian international footballerCláudio Ibrahim Vaz Leal (born 1964)
Branco (rapper), Danish rapper

Other uses
Il branco, a 1994 Italian drama film

See also

Castelo Branco (disambiguation)
Castello Branco (disambiguation)
Rio Branco (disambiguation)
Blanco (disambiguation), the Spanish equivalent
Branko, a South Slavic masculine given name